Ypsolopha costibasella is a moth of the family Ypsolophidae. It is found in the Russian Far East and in China (Beijing, Hebei, Shanxi).

References

Moths described in 1939
Ypsolophidae
Moths of Asia